Joseph Pearce (born 1961) is an English-born Catholic writer.

Joseph Pearce may also refer to:

Joseph Chilton Pearce (1926–2016), American writer
Joseph Algernon Pearce (1893–1988), Canadian astrophysicist

See also
Joe Pearce (disambiguation)